Ashot Zorian (1905–June 4, 1970) was a Turkish-born Egyptian painter and educator, of Armenian ethnicity. He was known for his Fauvist figure and still life paintings. He has many variations of his name in English and is also known as Ashot Zoryan, and Ashod Zorian.

Early life 
Ashot Zorian was born in 1905 in the coastal town of Giresun, Ottoman Empire (now northeastern Turkey). Not much is known about his early years and family, his mother's name is unknown; and his father was Apig Zorian, a lawyer. In 1915, during the start of the Armenian genocide, his father was murdered. 

His childhood was spent with his sister, living in exile in the mountain town of Şebinkarahisar. There are conflicting stories on exactly what happened in Şebinkarahisar, some say he was enslaved by a Turkish family, others read he was hired to work for a Kurdish family. His name was changed to Huseyin Zorian (or Hussein) during this time period. 

In the 1920s he was sent to the Armenian Yesayan Orphanage in Istanbul. He was one of the Armenian orphans that were awarded a stipend to study abroad in Europe.

Education 
He studied at the Armenian National School; Wiener Kunstschule (English: Vienna Art School) in Vienna; Accademia di Belle Arti di Roma in Rome; and the French Academy in Rome inside Villa Medici. In Rome he studied under Umberto Coromaldi.

Career 
In September 1929, Zorian moved to Alexandria, Egypt where his uncle was living. He participated in the annual salon exhibitions in Alexandria, and in Cairo, Egypt. In May 1932, he was awarded a bronze medal at the 3rd salon of Alexandria. In 1941, during World War II and after the Nazis bombed British military bases Alexandria; Zorian and his uncle fled to Cairo. His painting “The Resurrection of Christ” (1944) is located in an Armenian Orthodox Church in Cairo.

Zorian taught painting at the Boghosian Armenian National School (or Boghossian Armenian National School) in Alexandria, Egypt (1941); the Kalousdian Armenian National School at Boulaq in Cairo, Egypt (1941 to 1952); and in private lessons from his studio in Cairo, Egypt (1952 to 1968). His former students included Queen Farida of Egypt (in 1948), Edmond Kiraz, Garo Varjabedian, Harmig Ballarian, Khadiga Riad, Nora Ipekian, Eliz Partam, Joseph Egoyan, Shushan Deuletian-Egoyan, Rose Papazian, Chant Avedissian, Vahé Varjabedian, Laila Ezzat, Mervat Refaat, and Herant Antranikian.

Zorian had been separated from his sisters when he was sent to the orphanage and they were able to reunite in the late 1960s in Worcester, Massachusetts. His sisters helped him prepare the legal paperwork in the Soviet Union in order to donate some 100+ paintings to the National Gallery of Armenia after his death.

He died on June 4, 1970 in Cairo. His work is part of the collection at the National Gallery of Armenia.

Exhibitions 

 1929, Biennale of Circolo Artistico (English: Artistic Club), Rome, Italy 
 1929–after 1932, Annual Salon Exhibitions, Alexandria, Egypt
 After 1941–?, Annual Salon Exhibitions, Cairo, Egypt
 1939, Galerie Grégoire, Alexandria, Egypt, solo show
 1942, Hotel Continental, Cairo, Egypt, solo show
 1944, Société Orientale de publicité, Cairo, Egypt, solo show
 1948, Gallery A.D.A.M., Cairo, Egypt, solo show
 1952, winter Salon of Paris, France
 1955, 1st Alexandria Biennale, Alexandria, Egypt
 1957, Alexandria Biennale, Alexandria, Egypt
 1969, French Cultural Center, Cairo, Egypt, solo show
 2009, Byuzand Gojamanyan’s 100th anniversary, El Hanager Art Center of Cairo Opera House, Cairo, Egypt, group exhibition

See also 
 List of Egyptian Armenians

References 

1905 births
1970 deaths
People from Giresun
People from Şebinkarahisar
Artists from Alexandria
Artists from Cairo
People from the Ottoman Empire of Armenian descent
Egyptian people of Armenian descent
Accademia di Belle Arti di Roma alumni
20th-century Armenian painters